Laura Moisă (née Chiper; born 21 August 1989) is a retired Romanian handballer who played for Romanian national team.

Achievements
Liga Naţională:
Silver Medalist: 2014
Bronze Medalist: 2015, 2016
Cupa României:
Finalist: 2013
EHF Cup:
Semifinalist: 2015
World Championship:
Bronze Medalist: 2015

Awards
 Cupa României Best Scorer: 2013

References

1989 births
Living people
Sportspeople from Bacău
Romanian female handball players
Handball players at the 2016 Summer Olympics
Olympic handball players of Romania